Rock Branch is a stream in the U.S. state of Missouri. It is a tributary of Huzzah Creek.

Rock Branch was named for the rocky character of its watercourse.

See also
List of rivers of Missouri

References

Rivers of Crawford County, Missouri
Rivers of Missouri